Jews have settled in Maryland since the 17th century. As of 2018, Maryland's population was 3.9% Jewish at 201,600 people. The largest Jewish populations in Maryland are in Montgomery County and the Baltimore metropolitan area, particularly Pikesville and northwest Baltimore. As of 2010, Baltimore and Baltimore County was home to a Jewish community of around 100,000 people. The Maryland suburbs of Washington, D.C. (Montgomery County and Prince George's County) have a Jewish population of around 116,700 as of 2017, with the majority residing in lower Montgomery County. The Rockville/Potomac area is the center of Montgomery County's Jewish population, while sizable communities also exist in the Bethesda/Chevy Chase area and in Silver Spring's Kemp Mill neighborhood. Smaller Jewish communities exist in Gaithersburg, Germantown, White Oak, Olney, and Takoma Park. Columbia, Frederick, Annapolis, Cumberland, and Easton are also home to smaller but significant Jewish populations.

History
Because the Province of Maryland lacked major cities and the economy focused primarily around the tobacco industry, few Jews settled in Maryland for the first century and a half following the colony's founding in 1634.

Jacob Lumbrozo is the first known Jewish resident of Maryland, having settled in the Province of Maryland in 1656.

Prior to 1826, Jews were prohibited from holding public office in Maryland. Maryland was one of the last states to have antisemitic laws prohibiting Jews from holding public office. On January 5, 1826, the Maryland General Assembly passed the Jew Bill repealing the prohibition.

Between the 1830s and the 1870s, 10,000 German and Central European Jews settled in Maryland. Eastern European Jews began to settle in Maryland in the 1850s, with a mass emigration of Eastern European Jews occurring between the 1880s and the 1920s.

In 1899, 35,000 Jewish people lived in the state of Maryland.

In 1904, Isidor Rayner was elected the first Jewish US Senator from Maryland, one of the first Jewish US Senators in American history.

In 1969, Marvin Mandel became the first Jewish Governor of Maryland.

See also

History of the Jews in Baltimore
History of the Jews in Cumberland, Maryland
History of the Jews in Frederick, Maryland
History of the Jews in Washington, D.C.

References

External links
Associated Jewish Federation of Baltimore
Charles E. Smith Life Communities
Jewish Federation of Greater Washington
Jewish Museum of Maryland
Star-K Kosher Certification
Vaad HaRabanim, the Rabbinical Council of Greater Washington

 
Jews
Maryland